Muirgheas mac Aedh (died 999) was king of Uí Díarmata until he was killed in 999.

References

People from County Galway
999 deaths
10th-century Irish monarchs
Year of birth unknown